Tamsin Margaret Mary Greig (born 12 July 1966) is an English actress, known for both dramatic and comedic roles. She played Fran Katzenjammer in the Channel 4 sitcom Black Books, Dr Caroline Todd in the Channel 4 sitcom Green Wing, Beverly Lincoln in British-American sitcom Episodes and Jackie Goodman in the Channel 4 sitcom Friday Night Dinner. Other roles include Alice Chenery in BBC One's comedy-drama series Love Soup, Debbie Aldridge in BBC Radio 4's soap opera The Archers, Miss Bates in the 2009 BBC version of Jane Austen's Emma, and Beth Hardiment in the 2010 film version of Tamara Drewe. In 2020, Greig starred as Anne Trenchard in Julian Fellowes' ITV series Belgravia.

Greig is also a stage actress. She won a Laurence Olivier Award for Best Actress in 2007 for Much Ado About Nothing, and was nominated in 2011 and 2015 for her roles in The Little Dog Laughed and Women on the Verge of a Nervous Breakdown.

Early life
Greig was born in Maidstone, Kent, the second of three sisters. Her father, Eric, worked as a colour chemist creating dyes, and her mother, Ann, was enthusiastic about amateur dramatics. Her maternal grandfather was a Polish Jew. The family moved to Kilburn when she was three.

She went to Malorees Junior School, followed by Camden School for Girls later graduating with a first-class BA in Drama and Theatre Arts from the University of Birmingham in 1988. After graduating, she worked at the Family Planning Association and continued doing temporary work until 1996. She also spent some time at a secretarial college.

Career
Her professional acting career began in early 1990. Greig is known for both dramatic and comedic roles.

Radio
Greig has had a long-running part as Debbie Aldridge in the BBC Radio 4 soap opera The Archers since 1991. As her other work increased, her appearances in the show decreased and her character Debbie spends most of her time living in Hungary.

Her other radio work includes narrating the Radio 4 comedy Warhorses of Letters, and guest-starring in five episodes of the second series of the radio version of Absolute Power, playing Charles Prentiss's former lover Gayle Shand, who now runs a rival firm.

Television
Greig appeared in a number of supporting parts, notably as Lamia in Neverwhere (1996) and The Mother in an episode of People Like Us (2000). Her first major role was Fran Katzenjammer in the sitcom Black Books, which ran for three series from 2000. Fran was a friend of the main character, Bernard, and originally owned a gift shop called "Nifty Gifty" next door to his bookshop.

In 2004, she played constantly embarrassed surgical registrar Dr Caroline Todd, the lead character in the Channel 4 comedy drama series Green Wing. Her performance won her "Best Comedy Performance" in the 2005 Royal Television Society Awards. She also appeared as Caroline in an appearance at The Secret Policeman's Ball.

She starred in the BBC comedy drama series Love Soup (2005), as Alice Chenery, a lovelorn woman working on a department store perfume counter, in a role specifically written for her by David Renwick, whom she met in 2003 when she appeared in an episode of Jonathan Creek. In May 2005 she also appeared as a nurse in an episode of the BBC series Doctor Who, entitled "The Long Game".

Greig appeared in the role of Edith Frank in the BBC's January 2009 production of The Diary of Anne Frank. Also in 2009, she appeared as Miss Bates in the BBC serial Jane Austen's Emma. In 2010, she played Sacharissa Cripslock in the two part mini-series Terry Pratchett's Going Postal.

In 2011, she starred in the BBC/Showtime sitcom Episodes, alongside Matt LeBlanc and Green Wing co-star Stephen Mangan. Greig and Mangan play a husband-and-wife writing duo who travel to America to work on an adaptation of their successful series. Greig also stars in the Channel 4 sitcom, Friday Night Dinner, as Jackie Goodman, the mother of a North London Jewish family.

She played Beth in the 2012 BBC series White Heat.
She is also the lead in The Guilty in the three-part series on ITV in 2013, playing DCI Maggie Brand who investigates the death of a young child who went missing five years previously.
 In 2014, she played Sally in the Inside No. 9 episode "Last Gasp".

In 2015 the fourth season of Episodes was aired, and in 2016 a seven-episode fifth season, still starring Greig alongside Stephen Mangan and Matt LeBlanc, was filmed in London.

In October 2018 it was confirmed that Greig would narrate The Secret Life of the Zoo, taking over from Olivia Colman.

Greig has received three BAFTA nominations for her TV work. She was nominated for Best Comedy Performance for Green Wing in 2005, and for Best Female Comedy Performance for Friday Night Dinner in 2012 and Episodes in 2015.

Theatre
During 2006 and early 2007, Greig played Beatrice in a much acclaimed production of Much Ado About Nothing for which she won a Laurence Olivier Award, and Constance in King John, as part of the Royal Shakespeare Company's The Complete Works season. Whilst the win itself was a surprise, her acceptance speech was received very well as being highly entertaining, claiming that she was so excited that she had wet her dress. The speech was apparently completely improvised. Backstage, when told not to tell her mother about her wetting her dress, she told the host that her mum was dead before dedicating her award to her "dead mum". She also won the Critics' Circle Theatre Award for "Best Shakespearean Performance" in Much Ado About Nothing, becoming the first woman to win the award, and was nominated for "The FRANCO'S Best Actress in a Play" in the Whatsonstage Theatregoers' Choice Awards.

At the Gielgud Theatre in March 2008, she co-starred with Ralph Fiennes, Janet McTeer and Ken Stott in the UK premiere of Yasmina Reza's The God of Carnage (Le Dieu du carnage) translated by Christopher Hampton and directed by Matthew Warchus. The play won the Laurence Olivier Award for Best New Comedy in 2009. In 2008, she co-starred in the surreal sci-fi film Captain Eager and the Mark of Voth.

In November 2008, she made her National Theatre debut in Gethsemane, a new play by David Hare which toured the UK.
Greig was starring in The Little Dog Laughed by Douglas Carter Beane at the Garrick Theatre in London, which did run a limited season until 10 April 2010. She starred alongside Rupert Friend, Gemma Arterton and Harry Lloyd, and the play was directed by Jamie Lloyd. She won the 2011 WhatsOnStage Theatregoers Choice Award for Best Supporting Actress in a play for her portrayal. Her performance as Diane in The Little Dog Laughed garnered her a second Olivier Award nomination for Best Actress. In October 2011 she was Hilary, the central character, in Jumpy at the Royal Court, London., which later transferred to the Duke of York's Theatre in the West End. In March 2013 she played Varia in Longing, a new play by William Boyd based on two short stories by Chekov, at the Hampstead Theatre. Greig previously performed in Women on the Verge of a Nervous Breakdown at the Playhouse Theatre, London, until May 2015. In March 2015, she received a nomination for the Laurence Olivier Award for Best Actress in a Musical.

In October 2016, she returned to the Hampstead Theatre to play Empty in The Intelligent Homosexual's Guide to Capitalism and Socialism with a Key to the Scriptures by Tony Kushner.  In February 2017 she returned to the Royal National Theatre to play Malvolia in a new production of Twelfth Night at the Olivier Theatre. As a Labour constituency agent spanning a period of 27 years, she gave a  "polished...magnificent" performance in James Graham Labour of Love at the Noël Coward Theatre, London, in October 2017.

Film
Greig made a cameo appearance in the 2004 comedy Shaun of the Dead. She starred with Richard E. Grant in the 2009 film Cuckoo, and with Roger Allam and Gemma Arterton in Tamara Drewe (2010). The latter role earned Greig a British Independent Film Awards nomination for Best Supporting Actress. She co-starred in 2015's comedy-drama The Second Best Exotic Marigold Hotel and in the 2016 release of Breaking the Bank, opposite Kelsey Grammer.

Personal life
Greig lives in a flat in Kensal Green, having moved back to the area in 1996 to be with her dying father. She became a Christian at this time, despite being brought up as an atheist. Greig is also a vegetarian.

Since 1997 she has been married to actor Richard Leaf, whom she met at a wrap party of Neil Gaiman's 1996 miniseries Neverwhere, and has three children.

She is a supporter of the National Health Service, giving her backing to a rally organised by pro-NHS protest group NHS Together. She also supports more practical teaching of Shakespeare in British schools, supporting the RSC's "Stand Up For Shakespeare" manifesto. Greig was one of 200 public figures who were signatories to a letter to The Guardian opposing Scottish independence in the run-up to the 2014 referendum on that issue.

Filmography

Film

Television

Theatre

Audio

Awards and nominations

References

External links

 
 
 tv.com  Tamsin Greig biography.
 Tamsin Greig – Drama Faces Biography of Tamsin Greig on the BBC Drama Faces website.
 Ms Tamsin Greig at Debrett's People of Today
 39 Winter 2012 | Arete Magazine  Extensive interview with Tamsin Greig by Craig Raine and Nina Raine

1966 births
Living people
People from Maidstone
Alumni of the University of Birmingham
English Christians
Converts to Christianity from atheism or agnosticism
Critics' Circle Theatre Award winners
English radio actresses
English soap opera actresses
English stage actresses
English television actresses
Laurence Olivier Award winners
People educated at Camden School for Girls
People from Camden Town
Royal Shakespeare Company members
English Shakespearean actresses
English people of Scottish descent
English people of Polish-Jewish descent
20th-century English actresses
21st-century English actresses
British comedy actresses
English film actresses
Actresses from Kent